Macrotermes carbonarius, also known as Kongkiak in Malay, is a large black species of fungus-growing termite in the genus Macrotermes. It is one of the most conspicuous species of Macrotermes found in the indomalayan tropics, forming large open foraging trails that can extend several metres in distance. M. carbonarius is unusually aggressive in comparison to other Macrotermes species, with the soldiers possessing large and well developed curved mandibles that can easily break skin. It is found in Cambodia, Indonesia, Malaysia, Myanmar, Singapore, Thailand and Vietnam.

Identification 
Soldiers, workers and imago of this species are easily distinguished from other species in its range due to the almost jet-black coloration of their exoskeleton.

Like other Macrotermes species, M. carbonarius has a dimorphic worker and soldier caste, with the largest soldiers commonly reaching lengths of 15 – 18 mm.

Biology 

M. carbonarius is confined to elevations below 160 metres and primarily inhabits the tropical to subtropical lowland forests of Southeast Asia. It can be found across a wide variety of forested flat lands, most commonly in dipterocarp and coastal forests as well as rural areas and plantations.

The nests are large and conspicuous, broad and irregular in shape. No obvious ventilation system exists within the mound walls. The walls of the mound are thick and compact, varying 11-18 in width, and the height of the mound ranges from 30–48 cm. Majority of the colony and the fungus gardens resides either just slightly below or above ground level or entirely within the mound itself.

This species displays complex defensive behaviors when a breach of the mound occurs. In shallow breaches, a few minor and major soldiers rush out to face any threats while the workers retreat deeper into the nest, a normal behavior common to other Macrotermes species. However in the case of a deep breach, the soldiers assume defensive positions around the perimeter of the breach and begin hammering their heads against the walls of the mound in synchrony, creating a rhythmic rattling noise. It is believed this behavior evolved as a warning due to predation by vertebrates.

M. carbonarius is amongst the most free-ranging of Macrotermes species found in the indomalayan tropics. It forages above the ground from numerous large subterranean tunnels that can extend between 33.8 – 112.8 metres from the nest before emerging onto the surface. Foraging trails may also then extend several metres above the surface and can be readily recognized as M. carbonarius by the positioning of a large amount of major and minor soldiers at the flanks. The trails are paved with soil pellets around the exit holes for some distance, and notably exhibit a trunk structure with branching forays in the upstream trails. Workers primarily forage for leaf litter which constitutes the principal diet of this species, although they will readily take decaying hardwood when available. Other sources such as palm fronds or dried blades of grass are also occasionally taken. These termites are more readily tolerant of desiccation, and can therefore forage for longer periods in areas that experience harsher conditions than most other Macrotermes species. They are primarily active during the night and early morning or late evening, although foraging activities may continue for longer in more favorable weather such as humid and overcast conditions.

The fungus comb of this species is notably less complex than that of its relatives, with a less defined airy grooved pattern common to other Macrotermitinae. The termites, rather than continuously build upon the fungus comb with new substrate as it is gradually eaten, instead consume the entire comb after it has been completed and matured. Once being fully consumed, a new fungus comb is constructed in its place.

Reproduction 

Nuptial flights occur during daylight in the late afternoon, usually ~30 minutes before sunset. Windless, hot and dry conditions in the absence of rain following a day of heavy rain is preferred.

Horizontally elongated openings known as flight holes are constructed and opened around midday. If favorable conditions persist up to the late afternoon, massive nuptial flights consisting of hundreds or thousands alates are released by colonies. Flights are short in duration and last around 4–10 minutes. Flights occur as early as mid October, peaking in November, with smaller sporadic flights occurring from December to January.

References 

 

Termites
Insects of Asia
Taxa named by Hermann August Hagen
Insects described in 1858